Samrajyam II: Son of Alexander  is a 2015 Indian Malayalam-language action film directed by Perarasu in his Malayalam debut. The film is produced by Ajmal Hassan. It is a sequel to 1990 Malayalam cult classic film Samrajyam which stars Mammooty in the lead. Unni Mukundan played the lead role of Jordan, the son of Alexander who was the protagonist in the prequel. Akanksha Puri played the female lead making her debut in Malayalam. The film was simultaneously shot in Malayalam and Tamil with the latter titled Tihar.

The film's songs were composed by R. A. Shafeer whilst the background score was composed by S. P. Venkatesh, with lyrics written by Sarath Vayalar, while Shekar V. Joseph handled the cinematography. The film was released on 13 June 2015.

Cast

 Unni Mukundan as Jordan, Son of Alexander
 Akanksha Puri  as Saira IPS
 K.C.Shankar as Vikram Das
 Madhu as Balakrishnan IPS (Retd. IG)
 Vijayaraghavan as Khadar
 Rahul Menon as John Peter IPS 
 Devan as Surya Das
 Riyaz Khan as Sanjay Das 
 Suman as JJ
 Manoj K. Jayan as Stephen Antony, CBI officer
 Kalashala Babu as Bomb Bhaskaran (Malayalam version)
 Suraj Venjaramoodu as Theeppori Thankappan (Malayalam version)
 Kadhal Dhandapani as Bomb Bhaskaran (Tamil version)
 M. S. Bhaskar as Theeppori Thankappan (Tamil version)
 Mammootty as Alexander (Malayalam version) (archival footages only)
 Parthiban as Alexander (Tamil version)
Perarasu cameo appearance in song "Megathin Meethada"

Production
The film was produced by Ajmal Hassan. It was filmed in Spain, Australia, Dubai, England, Kochi, Chennai, Mumbai and Hyderabad. The film was released on 13 June 2015.

The film was shot in Tamil as Tihar with Parthiban.

Soundtrack
Music by R. A. Shafeer.
Malayalam version
"Saghi Ninte Neela" - Sadhana Sargam, R. A. Shafeer
"Meghathin Meethada" - Kumar Sanu, Lekha P.
"Kettu Pottiye Pole" - Sunidhi Chauhan
"Irutine Pootanai" - Shaan, Kushboo Jain

Tamil version
"Ezhuvannam Pola" - Ranjini Jose
"Methathai Meeruda" - Srikanth Deva, Krishnaveni Perarasu
"Sathiradum Neela" - Sathya Prakash, Vinitha
"Yarivan Yarivan" - Tippu

Reception

Malayalam version

Samrajyam 2 received highly negative reviews. Critics criticizing film by saying "this is the destruction of its first part". A critic from Indiaglitz stated that "Samrajyam 2 is nothing but a disaster". Jomon, the director of Samrajyam 1, highly criticized the film and said "Director Perarasu directed this cringe worthy sequel without watching it's prequel".

Tamil version
Tihar received negative reviews. A critic from Nettv4u wrote that "This is an onetime watcher movie".

References

External links 
 
 

Indian gangster films
2010s Malayalam-language films
Films shot in Spain
Films shot in London
Films shot in Sydney
Films shot in Dubai
Films shot in Mumbai
Films shot in Telangana
Films shot in Chennai
Films shot in Kochi
Films directed by Perarasu
2015 films
Jyam2
Indian multilingual films